Oleksandr Ksenofontov (or Xenophontov) (born 14 April 1968) is a Ukrainian record producer and lyricist. He is the husband of the winner of the Eurovision Song Contest 2004, Ruslana. Ksenofontov wrote the lyrics to the winning song, "Wild Dances".  They have been married since 28 December 1995. He is also a lead singer of legendary Ukrainian rock group Tea Fan Club (Club of Amateurs of Tea or Клуб Шанувальників Чаю). Together with Ruslana, he is the owner of the Luxen Company.

He is the author of the lyrics of most of Ruslana's Ukrainian songs.

References 

1968 births
Musicians from Lviv
Ukrainian record producers
Living people
Eurovision Song Contest winners